The 2010 International GT Open season was the fifth season of the International GT Open. The season commenced on 17 April at Circuit Ricardo Tormo in Valencia and finished on 31 October, at Circuit de Catalunya after 16 races held at eight meetings.

AF Corse wrapped up three different championships during the season, winning both Super GT titles for drivers Álvaro Barba and Pierre Kaffer as well as the teams title having run as many as five cars during the season. Kaffer and Barba took the overall title by five points ahead of Autorlando Sport's pairing Gianluca Roda and Richard Lietz. A further two points behind were the Edil Cris pairing of Raffaele Giammaria and Enrico Toccacelo, who finished ten points ahead of IMSA Performance's Raymond Narac and Patrick Pilet. The four pairings remained in the same order in the Super GT championship standings, with Barba and Kaffer, and Narac and Pilet winning the most races with four. Two victories were taken by Lietz and Roda, and Giammaria and Toccacelo, with other victories taken by CRS Racing's Tim Mullen, who took three wins – two with Chris Niarchos and one with Adam Christodoulou – while the other victory was secured by Villois Racing's Massimiliano Wiser and Lucas Guerrero.

A strong end of season run by Kessel Racing's Marco Frezza helped him claim the GTS title, with three successive wins allowing him to overhaul a 16-point deficit to Jean-Philippe Dayraut of Luxury Racing. Frezza took five wins overall on the season, two with Pedro Couceiro and three with Niki Cadei. Dayraut took four wins, three with Stéphane Ortelli and one with Johan-Boris Scheier. Third place was taken by Frezza's team-mates at Kessel Racing, Lorenzo Bontempelli and Stefano Livio, who took race victories at Imola, Brands Hatch and Monza. Other victories were taken by Dimitris Deverikos and Thomas Gruber, and Andrea Cecatto and Alessio Salucci at Valencia, Duncan Cameron and Matt Griffin at Brands Hatch, and Stefano Borghi and Gianluca de Lorenzi at Circuit de Spa-Francorchamps. Kessel Racing easily won the teams title, scoring more than double the points of runners-up Luxury Racing. Frezza finished as the highest GTS driver in the overall standings, in tenth position ahead of Dayraut.

Entry list

Calendar
The calendar was last modified on 5 February 2010, having been first announced on 15 December 2009. Older provisional schedules included races at Autódromo Internacional do Algarve and Donington Park. Several rounds were held along with the Auto GP and supported by the European F3 Open Championship.

Championship standings

Drivers

Overall
Points were awarded to drivers in two different systems. The first system rewarded drivers who finished in the top nine overall regardless of class. Points were awarded on a 12–10–8–6–5–4–3–2–1 basis. The second system related to class placings, with points awarded on a 10–8–6–4–3 basis to the top five in each class. Theoretically, the maximum score per race was 22 points.

Super GT
Points were awarded to the top five finishers on a 10–8–6–4–3 basis.

GTS
Points were awarded to the top five finishers on a 10–8–6–4–3 basis.

Teams

Super GT
Points were awarded to the top five finishers on a 10–8–6–4–3 basis.

GTS
Points were awarded to the top five finishers on a 10–8–6–4–3 basis.

References

External links
Official website

International GT Open
International GT Open seasons